or  is a village in Lyngen Municipality in Troms og Finnmark county, Norway. The village is located along the Lyngen fjord.

References

Villages in Troms
Lyngen